Michael Gutenplan (born April 17, 1981) on Long Island, New York, is a professional magician and mentalist. A third generation psychic, he currently performs mind reading shows at corporate, private, and country club events.  He has created and produced programs for television and written various articles about travel and Broadway for MSNBC.COM. He is a member of the Academy of Magical Arts at the Magic Castle and the Psychic Entertainers Association.

Gutenplan currently resides in Los Angeles, California. His show, The Members Only Show, is considered the top special member event at private clubs - and he was awarded the prestigious Excellence in Achievement Award by BoardRoom Magazine for 'Best Club Entertainment." In addition to club shows, Gutenplan is an in-demand performer for corporate and private clients across the nation.  

He created and starred in Dark Minds, seen during 2021's Fright Fest at the Gearworks Theater in Six Flags Magic Mountain. His virtual show, created during the COVID-19 pandemic, was highly rated and has been seen by thousands of happy audiences in their homes.

Michael started performing magic when he was a student at Carnegie Mellon University where he studied Drama in the College of Fine Arts.  During his time in Pittsburgh, Michael worked as the magician for the Pittsburgh Steelers and at Dave & Busters as well as Loews Movie Theater at The Waterfront shopping complex.  

Gutenplan was introduced to magic by his grandfather, who was an amateur magician and a believer in the psychic.  Both Michael's father and grandfather claim to have ESP and psychic intuition, which Gutenplan has embraced with his "third generation psychic" title as well as his tagline "Can He Unlock Your Psychic Potential?"

He has performed his one-man Off-Broadway show "Extraordinary Deceptions" in New York and California.  His show, "The Spy Magic Show" was performed at the Ritz Carlton in Washington, D.C. The Members Only Show - an evening of magic and mind reading is currently performed at private clubs around the nation.  He is considered the only magician and mentalist to work specifically in the world of private member only clubs.

Michael is a noted expert in palm reading and was the technical advisor for the Hulu series Shut Eye.

References 
http://www.broadwayworld.com/los-angeles/article/A-Magical-Holiday-Extravaganza-at-Powerhouse-Theatre-20071107
https://www.playbill.com/article/michael-gutenplan-brings-live-interactive-magic-and-mind-reading-show-direct-to-your-home-tonight
http://www.stagescenela.com/2007/12/extraordinary-deceptions/

American magicians
Mentalists
1981 births
Living people